The 1980–81 NBA season was the Hawks' 32nd season in the NBA and 13th season in Atlanta.

Draft picks

Roster

Regular season

Season standings

z - clinched division title
y - clinched division title
x - clinched playoff spot

Record vs. opponents

Game log

Player statistics

Player Statistics Citation:

Awards and records
 Dan Roundfield, NBA All-Defensive Second Team

Transactions

References

See also
 1980-81 NBA season

Atlanta Hawks seasons
Atlanta Hawks
Atlanta Hawks
A